The 1988 World Fencing Championships were held in Orléans, France.

Medal table

Women's events

References

FIE Results

World Fencing Championships
International fencing competitions hosted by France
1988 in French sport
Sport in Orléans
1988 in fencing